ANHAD (Act Now for Harmony and Democracy) is an Indian socio-cultural organization established in March 2003, as a response to 2002 Gujarat riots. Social activist Shabnam Hashmi, sister of the slain activist Safdar Hashmi and founder of SAHMAT, Marxian historian Prof. K N Panikkar and social activist Harsh Mander are the founding members of ANHAD. Based in Delhi, ANHAD works in the field of secularism, human rights and communal harmony. ANHAD's activities include secular mobilization, sensitizing people about their democratic rights as enshrined in Indian Constitution, research and publication of books and reports, welfare programs for marginalised sections of society, launching creative mass mobilization campaigns. People's tribunals. It also work as a pressure group among political circle to take action against communalism. ANHAD plays a major role in Gujarat to fight against human right violations, as well as in the Kashmir Valley.

ANHAD is registered as a trust and has six trustees as of now: They are Shabnam Hashmi, Aban Raza, Amrita Nandy, Harsh Mander, Shubha Menon and Mukhtar Shaikh.

History
The organisation works with victims of communal violence, and in 2005, ANHAD rehabilitated 25 children from the 2002 Gujarat riots in Delhi. Initially they lived in Apna Ghar hostel in Jaitpur on Delhi's outskirts, later shifted to a new hostel, Bal Sahyog,  in Connaught Place, the children study at Balwant Rai Mehta School in Greater Kailash II. It took the initiative in screening the film Parzania in Gujarat in April 2007. The film based on a Parsi family who lost their son during the 2002 Gujarat riots, was not screened in the state, upon its nationwide release in January, as the cinema owners feared backlash.

In July 2010, in a statement, ANHAD said, "“The presence of the Army and security forces dominates the (Srinagar) Valley and reinforces the deep-rooted angst of people.

ANHAD filed a plea against the Delhi Police in Batla house encounter case.

Reports published by ANHAD
Interim Report of Independent People's Tribunal on Human Rights Violations in Kashmir 
 Systematic discrimination oozing out of the pores in Gujarat
 National Meet on Status of Muslims: Summary of Findings and Recommendations
 26/11 Mumbai 
 5 Years of ANHAD: 2003-2008 
 Visit to Orissa 
 ANHAD in Kashmir 
 State Ka Order Hai
 Interim Observations - Tribunal On Atrocities Against Minorities 
 Selected Testimonies: Tribunal on the Atrocities against Minorities in the Name of Fighting Terrorism 
Citizen's Fact Finding Report on Dhule Riots

To support the proposed Women's Reservation Bill, ANHAD along with the support of various other organizations, organized a nationwide campaign called "Reservation Express" in 2009, which involved three caravans travelling through the country, apart from Campaign, public meetings, conferences and cultural programmes.

References

External links
 BJP lifts now ANHAD’s photo for its "Kashmir Bachao Divas" ad - TCN News
 Reservation Express (Pass the Women's Reservation Bill now!), website

Organisations based in Delhi
Human rights organisations based in India
Organizations established in 2003
Political advocacy groups in India
Secularist organizations
Secularism in India